Steven Coy Enoch (born September 18, 1997) is an American-born naturalized Armenian professional basketball player for Saski Baskonia of the Spanish Liga ACB and the EuroLeague. He played college basketball for the UConn Huskies and the Louisville Cardinals.

High school career
Enoch attended Norwalk High School before transferring to St. Thomas More School for his senior year. As a senior, he was named Connecticut Gatorade Player of the Year after averaging 15 points and 11 rebounds per game and leading his team to the New England Class AAA semifinals. Enoch committed to UConn shortly after the team won the 2014 national title, choosing the Huskies over VCU, Virginia, Providence, UCLA, Seton Hall and Rhode Island. He cited his friendship with Andre Drummond, who he met at the age of nine.

College career
Enoch played two seasons at UConn. He averaged 3.4 points and 2.3 rebounds per game as a sophomore, but saw his role shrink in the middle of conference play due to a right foot injury that caused him to miss five games. Enoch transferred after its first losing season in 30 years, joining Louisville on April 23, 2017. During his redshirt season, the program was hit with sanctions and coach Rick Pitino was fired, to be replaced by Chris Mack. As a junior, he averaged 9.4 points and 5.2 rebounds per game and helped the team reach the NCAA Tournament. Enoch had several good games towards the end of the season, scoring 14 points against Duke, 22 points against Boston College, and 14 points in the NCAA Tournament against Minnesota. Enoch considered turning pro after his junior season, but ultimately opted to focus on improving his game. As a senior, Enoch averaged 9.5 points and 5.6 rebounds per game, while shooting 54.1% from the field. Out of the last 22 games he played, Enoch scored in double figures in 12 games. Enoch scored a career-high 23 points versus Eastern Kentucky and pulled down a career-best 14 rebounds against Youngstown State. He posted 18 points in an overtime loss to Kentucky.

Professional career
On July 25, 2020, Enoch signed with Obradoiro of the Spanish Liga ACB.

On August 19, 2021, he has signed with Saski Baskonia of the Liga ACB.

National team career
Enoch has played for Armenia in several international tournaments, having obtained dual citizenship, he has no Armenian ancestry but has trained in Armenia before traveling to tournaments. At the 2016 FIBA U20 European Championship, he averaged 17.3 points and 15.2 rebounds per game in Armenia's six games. In July 2017, he played in the FIBA U20 European Championship in Crete, Greece.

Career statistics

College

|-
| style="text-align:left;"| 2015–16
| style="text-align:left;"| UConn
| 27 || 0 || 7.0 || .543 || – || .429 || 1.5 || .0 || .0 || .1 || 1.6
|-
| style="text-align:left;"| 2016–17
| style="text-align:left;"| UConn
| 29 || 3 || 12.1 || .410 || .000 || .682 || 2.3 || .1 || .2 || .6 || 3.4
|-
| style="text-align:left;"| 2017–18
| style="text-align:left;"| Louisville
| style="text-align:center;" colspan="11"|  Redshirt
|-
| style="text-align:left;"| 2018–19
| style="text-align:left;"| Louisville
| 34 || 14 || 19.1 || .528 || .359 || .818 || 5.2 || .2 || .2 || .6 || 9.4
|-
| style="text-align:left;"| 2019–20
| style="text-align:left;"| Louisville
| 31 || 28 || 20.4 || .516 || .333 || .740 || 5.6 || .4 || .3 || .6 || 9.5
|- class="sortbottom"
| style="text-align:center;" colspan="2"| Career
| 121 || 45 || 15.1 || .507 || .343 || .736 || 3.8 || .2 || .2 || .5 || 6.2

References

External links
Louisville Cardinals bio
UConn Huskies bio

1997 births
Living people
American expatriate basketball people in Spain
American men's basketball players
Armenian men's basketball players
Basketball players from Connecticut
Liga ACB players
Louisville Cardinals men's basketball
Norwalk High School (Connecticut) alumni
Obradoiro CAB players
People from Norwalk, Connecticut
Power forwards (basketball)
Saski Baskonia players
UConn Huskies men's basketball players